T-Zero may refer to:
          
 "T-Zero" riot response squad, an organization featured in Urban Chaos: Riot Response
 Trauma Zero, formerly T-Zero